Usta River may refer to:
Usta (Norway)
Usta River (Russia)

no:Usta (andre betydninger)